Andrew Whittaker may refer to:

 Jack Whittaker (lottery winner) (Andrew Jackson Whittaker, Jr., born 1947), won a 2002 lottery jackpot
 Andrew Whittaker (engineer) (born 1956), American structural engineer